Dead of Night is a 1945 black and white British anthology horror film, made by Ealing Studios. The individual segments were directed by Alberto Cavalcanti, Charles Crichton, Basil Dearden and Robert Hamer. It stars Mervyn Johns, Googie Withers, Sally Ann Howes and Michael Redgrave. The film is best remembered for the concluding story featuring Redgrave and an insane ventriloquist's malevolent dummy.

Dead of Night is a rare British horror film of the 1940s; horror films were banned from production in Britain during World War II. It had an influence on subsequent British films in the genre. Both of John Baines' stories were reused for later films and the ventriloquist dummy episode was adapted into the pilot episode of the long-running CBS radio series Escape.

While primarily in the horror genre, the film has shades of the comedy that would make the studio's name.

Plot
Walter Craig arrives at a country cottage in Kent, where he is greeted by his host Elliot Foley. Craig is an architect whom Foley has invited to his home to consult on some renovations. Upon entering the sitting room of the cottage, Craig tells Foley and his assembled guests that, despite never having met any of them, he has seen them all in a recurring dream.

Craig appears to have no prior personal knowledge of them, but is able to predict events in the house before they unfold. Craig partially recalls that something awful will later occur. Dr. van Straaten, a psychologist, tries to persuade Craig that his fears are unfounded. The other guests attempt to test Craig's foresight and entertain each other with tales of strange events they experienced or were told about.

Racing car driver Hugh Grainger recalls lying in hospital after an accident. One night, the peripheral noises of the ward cease and the time on his bedside clock changes. He opens the curtains to see that it is daytime, and a horse-drawn hearse is parked outside. The hearse driver calls up, "just room for one inside, sir". After being discharged from the hospital, Grainger waits for a bus. The bus conductor, who exactly resembles the hearse driver, tells him, "just room for one inside, sir". Grainger does not board the bus. As it drives away, the bus swerves and plunges down an embankment.

Sally O'Hara remembers attending a Christmas party at a mansion. During a game of hide-and-seek, Sally hides behind a curtain and is found by Jimmy, who tells her of a murder that once happened in the mansion. She finds a door which leads to a nursery, where she hears a young boy, Francis Kent, weeping. She consoles him and tucks him into bed. When she returns to the main room, she is told Francis Kent was murdered by his sister Constance.

Joan Cortland tells of an incident in which she gave her husband Peter a mirror for his birthday one year. Upon looking into it, he sees himself in a room other than his own. Joan learns that the mirror's previous owner, Francis Etherington, killed his wife on a suspicion of adultery, before slitting his own throat in front of the mirror. Peter, too, accuses Joan of being unfaithful and attempts to strangle her, but she breaks the mirror, returning Peter to his normal mental state.

Foley recounts two golfers, George Parratt and Larry Potter, who both fell in love with a woman named Mary Lee. They decide to play a round of golf for Mary's hand in marriage. Parratt wins by cheating, and Potter drowns himself in a nearby lake. When he next plays golf, Parratt is interrupted by Potter's ghost. Potter demands he give up Mary or else he will continue to haunt him, but finds he has forgotten how to vanish. On the night of Parratt and Mary's wedding, Parratt unwittingly causes  to vanish, leaving Potter the opportunity to charm Mary.

Dr. van Straaten recollects interviewing ventriloquist Maxwell Frere, who performed with a dummy named Hugo. Upon meeting American ventriloquist Sylvester Kee, Hugo continually speaks about abandoning Frere and working with Kee instead. Frere attempts to silence Hugo, but Hugo bites his hand, drawing blood. Some time later at a hotel bar, Hugo insults a woman, and Frere is blamed. Kee brings Frere and Hugo to Frere's hotel room, placing Hugo on Frere's bed. The next morning, Frere accuses Kee of stealing Hugo, and finds Hugo in Kee's room. He shoots Kee and is arrested. Van Straaten arranges for Hugo to be brought to Frere's cell, where they have an argument that ends in Frere suffocating and smashing Hugo. Later, in an asylum, Frere speaks with Hugo's voice.

In the country home, Craig strangles Dr. van Straaten. Craig then hallucinates about the stories told by the other guests, before awakening in his bedroom as a phone rings. He receives a call from Elliot Foley, inviting him to his country home to consult on some renovations. Craig's wife suggests that spending a weekend in the country might help him get rid of his nightmares. Craig then drives up to Foley's cottage in Kent as in the start of the film.

Cast

Overarching story at farmhouse
(Directed by Basil Dearden)
Anthony Baird (credited as Antony Baird) as Hugh Grainger
Roland Culver as Eliot Foley
Renée Gadd as Mrs. Craig
Sally Ann Howes as Sally O'Hara the teenager
Mervyn Johns as Walter Craig
Judy Kelly as Joyce Grainger
Barbara Leake as Mrs. O'Hara
Mary Merrall as Mrs. Foley
Frederick Valk as Dr. van Straaten
Googie Withers as Joan Cortland

The Hearse Driver
(Directed by Basil Dearden; based on "The Bus-Conductor" by E. F. Benson, published in The Pall Mall Magazine in 1906)
Anthony Baird as Hugh Grainger
Judy Kelly as Joyce Grainger
Miles Malleson as the hearse driver/ bus conductor
Robert Wyndham as Dr. Albury

The Christmas Party
(Directed by Alberto Cavalcanti; story by Angus MacPhail)
Michael Allan as Jimmy Watson
Sally Ann Howes as Sally O'Hara
Barbara Leake as Mrs. O'Hara
? as Francis Kent the ghost

'Christmas Party' is based on the 1860 murder of Francis Saville Kent, for which his half-sister Constance Kent was convicted in 1865.

The Haunted Mirror
(Directed by Robert Hamer; story by John Baines)
Ralph Michael as Peter Cortland
Esmé Percy as Mr. Rutherford the antiques dealer
Googie Withers as Joan Cortland

The Golfer's Story
(Directed by Charles Crichton; based on "The Story of the Inexperienced Ghost" by H. G. Wells)
Peggy Bryan as Mary Lee
Basil Radford as George Parratt
Naunton Wayne as Larry Potter
Peter Jones as Fred the barman (uncredited)

Note
Parratt and Potter, as portrayed by Basil Radford and Naunton Wayne in the golfing story, are derivative of the characters Charters and Caldicott from Alfred Hitchcock's The Lady Vanishes (1938). The double-act proved to be popular enough for Radford and Wayne to be paired up as similar sport-obsessed English gentlemen (or occasionally reprising their original roles) in a number of productions, including this one.

The Ventriloquist's Dummy
(Directed by Alberto Cavalcanti, story by John Baines)
Allan Jeayes as Maurice Olcott
Magda Kun as Mitzi
Miles Malleson as the jailer
Garry Marsh as Harry Parker
Hartley Power as Sylvester Kee
Michael Redgrave as Maxwell Frere
Frederick Valk as Dr. van Straaten
Elisabeth Welch as Beulah

Release
The film opened at the Gaumont Haymarket cinema in London on 9 September 1945.

Reception

Box office
According to Kinematograph Weekly the film performed well at the British box office in 1945. The 'biggest winner' at the box office in 1945 Britain was The Seventh Veil, with "runners up" being (in release order), Madonna of the Seven Moons, Old Acquaintance, Frenchman's Creek, Mrs. Parkington, Arsenic and Old Lace, Meet Me in St. Louis, A Song to Remember, Since You Went Away, Here Come the Waves, Tonight and Every Night, Hollywood Canteen, They Were Sisters, The Princess and the Pirate, The Adventures of Susan, National Velvet, Mrs. Skefflington, I Live in Grosvenor Square, Nob Hill, Perfect Strangers, Valley of Decision, Conflict and Duffy's Tavern. British "runners-up" were They Were Sisters, I Live in Grosvenor Square, Perfect Strangers, Madonna of the Seven Moons, Waterloo Road, Blithe Spirit, The Way to the Stars, I'll Be Your Sweetheart, Dead of Night, Waltz Time and Henry V.

Critical reception
From a contemporary review, the Monthly Film Bulletin praised the tale of the ventriloquist, stating that it was "perhaps the best" and that it was perhaps Cavalcanti's "most polished work for many years". The review praised Basil Radford and Naunton Wayne for "providing excellent comic relief", and concluded that the art direction (Michael Relph), lighting (Stan Pavey and Douglas Slocombe) and editing (Charles Hassey) combine to make the smoothest film yet to come from an English studio". Film critic Leonard Maltin awarded the film 4 out of a possible 4 stars.

The site's critical consensus reads, "With four accomplished directors contributing, Dead of Night is a classic horror anthology that remains highly influential."

Legacy
The circular plot of Dead of Night inspired Fred Hoyle's steady state model of the universe, developed in 1948. Mario Livio in Brilliant Blunders cites the impact of a viewing of Dead of Night had on astrophysicists Fred Hoyle, Hermann Bondi, and Thomas Gold. "Gold asked suddenly, "What if the universe is like that?' meaning that the universe could be eternally circling on itself without beginning or end. Unable to dismiss this conjecture, they started to think seriously of an unchanging universe, a steady state universe.

In the early 2010s, Time Out conducted a poll with several authors, directors, actors and critics who have worked within the horror genre to vote for their top horror films. Dead of Night placed at number 35 on their top 100 list. Director Martin Scorsese placed Dead of Night 5th on his list of the 11 scariest horror films of all time. Writer/director Christopher Smith was inspired by the circular narrative in Dead of Night when making his 2009 film Triangle.

A shot of Redgrave from the film is featured on the cover of Merrie Land, an album by The Good, the Bad & the Queen.

Related
The theme of a recurring nightmare has been visited in other works and media:
"Shadow Play", a 1961 episode of The Twilight Zone television series
"The Secret Miracle", a short story by Jorge Luis Borges that also contains a recurring nightmare inside a framing story

The theme of the mad ventriloquist and his dummy with a life of its own has been visited in other works and media:
The Great Gabbo, a 1929 film starring Erich von Stroheim
Knock on Wood (1954), a Danny Kaye musical comedy
"The Glass Eye", a 1957 episode of the Alfred Hitchcock Presents television series, starring Jessica Tandy
"The Dummy", a 1962 episode of The Twilight Zone television series, starring Cliff Robertson
"Caesar and Me", a 1964 episode of The Twilight Zone television series, starring Jackie Cooper
Devil Doll, a 1964 film starring Bryant Haliday
Magic, a 1978 film starring Anthony Hopkins
It Couldn't Happen Here, a 1988 film by Pet Shop Boys
 The Ventriloquist and Scarface, a Batman enemy first appearing in 1988
"The Puppet Show", a 1997 episode of Buffy the Vampire Slayer
Dead of Night, a 2003 art exhibition by collaborative duo Beagles & Ramsay
Dead Silence, a 2007 film starring Judith Roberts and Donnie Wahlberg
The Beaver, a 2011 film starring Mel Gibson.

The theme of the fatal crash premonition has also been visited in other works and media:
 "The Bus-Conductor", a short story by E. F. Benson published in The Pall Mall Magazine in 1906 which was the basis for the segment in Dead of Night
Famous Ghost Stories, a 1944 anthology by Bennett Cerf which retells the Benson short story, but changes the main character to a woman and transfers the action to New York City
"Twenty Two", a 1961 episode of The Twilight Zone inspired by the Cerf story

The theme of a mirror casting a murderous spell has been visited in other works and media:
"The Mirror", a 1961 episode of The Twilight Zone
"The Gatecrasher" segment from the 1974 Amicus Productions anthology film From Beyond the Grave

See also
List of ghost films

References

Notes

Bibliography
Jerry Vermilye, The Great British Films, 1978, Citadel Press, pp. 85–87, 
Jez Conolly and David Owain Bates, "Devil's Advocates: Dead of Night", 2015, Auteur,

External links

 
 
 
Review of film at Variety
 
 

1945 films
1945 horror films
1940s psychological thriller films
1940s English-language films
British black-and-white films
British ghost films
Films based on works by H. G. Wells
Films set in country houses
Ealing Studios films
Universal Pictures films
Films directed by Alberto Cavalcanti
Films directed by Charles Crichton
Films directed by Basil Dearden
Films directed by Robert Hamer
Films produced by Michael Balcon
Films scored by Georges Auric
Ventriloquism
Films based on multiple works
British comedy horror films
British horror anthology films
Films about nightmares
British Christmas horror films
1940s British films